The Iljik Junction(Korean: 일직 분기점; Iljik Bungijeom) is a road junction located in Gwangmyeong, Gyeoggi, Republic of Korea.

Seohaean Expressway and Second Gyeongin Expressway intersect at this junction.

Roads

History 
 December 28, 1995: Opens to Traffic

Seohaean Expressway
Second Gyeongin Expressway
Expressway junctions in South Korea
Gwangmyeong
Anyang, Gyeonggi